The Women's 50 metre rifle three positions event at the 2012 Olympic Games took place on 4 August 2012 at the Royal Artillery Barracks.

The event consisted of two rounds: a qualifier and a final. In the qualifier, each shooter fired 60 shots with a .22 Long Rifle at 50 metres distance. 20 shots were fired each from the standing, kneeling, and prone positions. Scores for each shot were in increments of 1, with a maximum score of 10.

The top 8 shooters in the qualifying round moved on to the final round. There, they fired an additional 10 shots, all from the standing position. These shots scored in increments of .1, with a maximum score of 10.9. The total score from all 70 shots was used to determine final ranking.

Records
Prior to this competition, the existing world and Olympic records were as follows.

Qualification round

Final

References

Shooting at the 2012 Summer Olympics
Olymp
Women's events at the 2012 Summer Olympics
Women's 050m 3 positions 2012